Pinckard is an unincorporated community in Woodford County, Kentucky, United States. Pinckard is located on Kentucky Route 169 southwest of Lexington and south of Versailles.

References

Unincorporated communities in Woodford County, Kentucky
Unincorporated communities in Kentucky